Aida, I Saw Your Dad Last Night is a 2004 Iranian coming-of-age drama film directed by Rasul Sadrameli based on Marjan Shirmohammadi's Nora’s Father Novel.

Cast

 Sophie Kiani as Aida
 Sharareh Dolatabadi as Aida's Mother
 Shahrokh Foroutanian as Aida's Father
 Khatereh Asadi as Sanaz
 Tannaz Tabatabaei as Tannaz

References

External links
 

2004 films
2000s Persian-language films
Iranian drama films
2004 drama films